is Mami Kawada's first single for a major label and Kotoko's third, produced by I've Sound. The songs were used as the opening and ending theme respectively for the anime series Starship Operators. Two versions of the single were released: a limited edition (GNCA-0014) and a regular edition (GNCA-0015). The limited edition included a DVD containing the promotional video for both songs. The single reached #19 on the Oricon charts and stayed for 9 weeks. It sold a total of 28,706 copies.

Track listing
"Radiance" 4:21
Lyrics by: Mami Kawada & Kotoko
Composition & arrangement by: Tomoyuki Nakazawa
Performed by: Mami Kawada
 – 5:44
Lyrics & composition by: Kotoko
Arrangement by: Youichi Shimada
Performed by: Kotoko
Radiance (Original Karaoke) – 4:20
 – 5:44
Radiance (Instrumental) – 4:18

Charts and sales

References 

2005 singles
2005 songs
Mami Kawada songs
Kotoko (singer) songs
Anime songs
Songs with lyrics by Mami Kawada
Song recordings produced by I've Sound